On 10 February 1970, an avalanche in Val-d'Isère, Savoie, France, killed 39 people.

At 8:05 am on 10 February 1970, an avalanche struck the ski resort of Val-d'Isère in the French Alps. More than 100,000 cubic yards of snow fell into a three-storey, eight-year-old concrete chalet which housed about 200 people. It killed 39 young skiers and injured another 37.

References

1970 in France
1970 disasters in France
20th century in Auvergne-Rhône-Alpes
Savoie
Avalanches in France